This is a list of stations of the Newark City Subway, a rapid transit system serving Newark, New Jersey and its suburbs, Belleville and Bloomfield.

City Subway line

Cedar Street Subway (defunct)

References

 
Newark City Subway
Newark City Subway